The Air Force Falcons football statistical leaders are individual statistical leaders of the Air Force Falcons football program in various categories, including passing, rushing, receiving, total offense, defensive stats, and kicking. Within those areas, the lists identify single-game, single-season, and career leaders. The Falcons represent the United States Air Force Academy (USAFA) in the NCAA's Mountain West Conference.

Although Air Force began competing in intercollegiate football in 1955, these lists are dominated by more recent players for several reasons:
 Since 1955, seasons have increased from 10 games to 11 and then 12 games in length.
 The NCAA didn't allow freshmen to play varsity football until 1972, allowing players to have four-year careers.
 Bowl games only began counting toward single-season and career statistics in 2002. The Falcons have played in nine bowl games since this decision, giving recent players an extra game to accumulate statistics.
 Due to COVID-19 disruptions, the NCAA ruled that the 2020 season would not count against the eligibility of any football player. While the service academies generally do not redshirt players, the Department of the Air Force allowed the USAFA to give its cadet athletes an extra season of eligibility. (Army was given this same option, but Navy was not.)

The values on these list are often smaller than the values seen on other programs' lists for several reasons:
 Air Force has only played since 1955, making it a relatively new college football program.
 The Air Force Academy is a four-year undergraduate program, so it does not redshirt players under normal circumstances. This means that for a player to play for four years, he must be good enough to see the field as a true freshman. Relatively few players are prepared to do this, which depresses career records.
 Air Force has run a triple option offense since the arrival of head coach Ken Hatfield in 1978. This offense emphasizes running over passing. Most passing records were established in the 24-year period before this time.

These lists are updated through the end of the 2021 season.

Passing

Passing completions

Passing yards

Passing touchdowns

Rushing

Rushing yards

Rushing touchdowns

Receiving

Receptions

Receiving yards

Receiving touchdowns

Total offense
Total offense is the sum of passing and rushing statistics. It does not include receiving or returns.

Total offense yards

Touchdowns responsible for
"Touchdowns responsible for" is the NCAA's official term for combined passing and rushing touchdowns.

Defense

Interceptions

Tackles

Sacks

Kicking

Field goals made

Field goal percentage

References

Air Force